Mount Thor is a prominent peak, about 2,000 m, standing south of the Labyrinth in the Asgard Range of Victoria Land, Antarctica. It was named by the Victoria University of Wellington Antarctic Expedition (VUWAE) (1958–59) for Thor, the Norse god.
 

Mountains of the Asgard Range